Jennifer "Jenn" Baxter (born April 4, 1987 in Halifax, Nova Scotia) is a Canadian curler from Lower Sackville, Nova Scotia. She currently plays third on Team Christina Black out of the Mayflower Curling Club in Halifax.

Career

Juniors
During Baxter's junior eligibility years, she would only make one appearance at the Canadian Junior Curling Championships. This appearance took place at the 2007 Canadian Junior Curling Championships, where Baxter, playing lead for Marie Christianson, represented Nova Scotia. Her team failed to make the playoffs, finishing round robin with a 6-6 record.

2009–current
Baxter would team up with and play second for Mary-Anne Arsenault at the start of the 2009/2010 curling season. The team entered the 2010 Nova Scotia Scotties Tournament of Hearts, where they quickly found success. They would finish round robin in first place with a 5-2, and received a bye to the final. There they faced Nancy McConnery, where their success came to an end, losing the championship game 4-5.

The team would return to the provincials in 2011, where for a second year in a row, they would finish with a 5-2 record. This was enough to secure second place. They would meet Heather Smith-Dacey in the semi-final, but would lose 3-8.

In 2012, Baxter would change positions and move to lead, when Arsenault brought former teammate Kim Kelly into the lineup at second. The team entered the 2012 Nova Scotia Scotties Tournament of Hearts, where they finished round robin with a 4-3 record. This was enough to take the team into a tiebreaker. They would face Colleen Pinkney in the tiebreaker game, but would not find success, losing and missing out on the playoffs.

For the 2012-13 curling season, the Arsenault team made another lineup change. Another former teammate of Arsenault, Colleen Jones was added to the lineup at third. Baxter continued to play lead. Adding the veteran Jones to the rink proved to be successful, as the team finally won the provincial championship, when they defeated the Jocelyn Nix rink in the final of the 2013 Nova Scotia Scotties Tournament of Hearts. The team represented Nova Scotia at the 2013 Scotties Tournament of Hearts, where they finished with a 5-6 record.

The following season, Jones left the rink, and was replaced by Kelly at third and Christie Gamble joined the rink at second. The team made the playoffs at the 2014 Nova Scotia Scotties Tournament of Hearts, after finishing the round robin with a 5-2 record. However they could not repeat their provincial championship, losing in the semi-final to the Kelly MacIntosh rink. After the season, Kelly and Gamble would be replaced with Christina Black and Jane Snyder. The team won two tour events early in the season, the Dave Jones Molson Mayflower Cashspiel and the Gibson's Cashspiel. They also won the 2015 Nova Scotia Scotties Tournament of Hearts, qualifying them for the 2015 Scotties Tournament of Hearts. There, the team finished in seventh place with a 5–6 record. In 2016, Jennifer Crouse joined at second when Snyder left the team. A few seasons later, they won the 2018 Nova Scotia Scotties Tournament of Hearts and won a bronze medal at the 2018 Scotties Tournament of Hearts. Later that year, the team won the 2018 New Scotland Clothing Ladies Cashspiel.

The Arsenault rink began the 2019–20 season by winning the 2019 Curling Store Cashspiel. The team won the provincial Scotties again in 2020, and represented Nova Scotia at the 2020 Scotties Tournament of Hearts with new lead Emma Logan. The team finished pool play with a 4–3 round robin record, in a tie with British Columbia's Corryn Brown rink. They lost to British Columbia in a tiebreaker, failing to advance.

In 2020, Arsenault announced she was moving to British Columbia. Baxter then joined the new rink skipped by Christina Black at third with front end Karlee Jones and Shelley Barker. In their first event together, the team won the 2020 Curling Store Cashspiel. The 2021 Nova Scotia Scotties was cancelled due to the COVID-19 pandemic in Nova Scotia, so the Nova Scotia Curling Association appointed Team Jill Brothers to represent the province at the 2021 Scotties Tournament of Hearts. Team Black would have been selected as the Nova Scotia representatives, however, they did not retain three out of their four players from the previous season.

Team Black won their first event of the 2021–22 season, The Curling Store Cashspiel, going undefeated to claim the title. They also reached the final of the Atlantic Superstore Monctonian Challenge, losing to the Andrea Crawford rink. In November, the team once again went undefeated to win the Tim Hortons Spitfire Arms Cash Spiel, defeating former teammate Jennifer Crouse in the final. At the 2022 Nova Scotia Scotties Tournament of Hearts, Team Black won all three qualifying events, winning the provincial title and securing their spot at the 2022 Scotties Tournament of Hearts. At the Hearts, the team had a 5–3 record in the round robin, which was enough to qualify for the championship round. Along the way, they scored victories over higher seeded teams such as Alberta's Laura Walker and Manitoba's Mackenzie Zacharias. They also defeated British Columbia, which was being skipped by former teammate Mary-Anne Arsenault. In their championship round match against Northern Ontario's Krista McCarville, Team Black got down 9–1 before coming back to make the game 9–8, eventually losing 11–8. This eliminated them from the championship.

Personal life
Baxter is employed as a learning centre teacher with the Halifax Regional Centre for Education. She is in married to Jason Wilson and has two stepchildren.

References

External links

1987 births
Canadian women curlers
Curlers from Nova Scotia
Living people
Sportspeople from Halifax, Nova Scotia
Canadian educators